Yoon Je-moon (born March 9, 1970) is a South Korean actor. He appears in theater, film and television, notably in the movies The Man Next Door (2010) and Dangerously Excited (2012), and the TV series The End of the World (2013).

Filmography

Film

 Ung-nam-i (TBA) (documentary film)
 Heaven: To the Land of Happiness (TBA)
 Excellence (2022) 
 Fukuoka (2020)
 Beasts Clawing at Straws (2020) (cameo)
 Tazza: One Eyed Jack (2019)
 Forbidden Dream (2019)
 The Drug King (2018)
 Ode to the Goose (2018)
 High Society (2018)
 My Wife (2017)
 Okja (2017)
 Daddy You, Daughter Me (2017)
 One Day (cameo) (2017)
 Asura: The City of Madness (special appearance) (2016)
 The Last Princess (2016)
 "Missing You" (2016)
 The Great Actor (2015)
 The Wait (2015)
 Three Summer Nights (2015)
 My Dictator (2014)
 Haemoo (2014)
 Commitment (2013)
 Boomerang Family (2013)
 Fists of Legend (2013)
 Dangerously Excited (2012)
 Doomsday Book (2012)
 Quick (2011)
 Battlefield Heroes (2011)
 Lovers Vanished (2010)
 The Man Next Door (2010)
 Chaw (2009)
 Mother (2009)
 Private Eye (2009)
 Boy Director (2008)
 The Good, the Bad, the Weird (2008)
 Life is Beautiful (2008)
 Love Exposure (2007)
 The Show Must Go On (2007)
 Voice of a Murderer (2007)
 Goodbye Children (short film, 2006))
 Cruel Winter Blues (2006)
 The Host (2006)
 A Dirty Carnival (2006)
 The Romance (2006)
 You Are My Sunshine (2005)
 Antarctic Journal (2005)
 Ghost House (2004)
 Influenza (Jeonju Digital Project 2004)
 Sink & Rise (short film in Twentidentity, 2003)
 Mobile (short film in Show Me, 2003)
 Jungle Juice (2002)
 Super Glue (short film, 2001)
 Golden Laughter (short film, 2000)

Television series
Reborn Rich (2022) 
 The King's Affection (2021)
Last (2015)
 Three Days (2014)
 The End of the World (2013)
 The King 2 Hearts (2012)
 Tree With Deep Roots (2011)
 Midas (2011)
 IRIS (2009)
 General Hospital 2 (2008)

Theater

2013
 Ode to Youth

2010
 Art
 The Pitmen Painters

2008
 Ode to Youth

2007  
 At Baekmudong
 The Pillowman

2004-2005
 Ode to Youth

2001
 쥐

1999
 Ode to Youth

(Undated)
 Battle of Black and Dogs    
 삽 아니면 도끼
 Generation After Generation
 물속에서 숨쉬는 자 하나도 없다
 Woman of the Year
 The Three Musketeers
 Gaettong from Beyond the Mountains
 Ogu
 The Island
 Six Characters in Search of an Author
 Hamlet
 Kiss
 Man Holding Flowers
 살려주세요
 타이거 외 다수
 禪

Awards
 2011 SBS Drama Awards: Special Acting Award, Actor in a Special Planning Drama (Midas)
 2010 Busan Film Critics Awards: Best Actor (The Man Next Door)
 2000 Dong-A Theatre Awards: Best Actor (Ode to Youth)

References

External links
 
 

South Korean male film actors
South Korean male stage actors
South Korean male television actors
1970 births
Living people
21st-century South Korean male actors